Nicola Rodigari (born November 7, 1981) is an Italian short track speed skater who competed in the 2002, 2006 and 2010 Winter Olympics.

He was born in Tirano.

In 2002 he was a member of the Italian relay team which won the silver medal in the 5000 metre relay competition. In the 1000 metre event he finished 13th and in the 1500 metre contest he finished 14th.

Four years later he was part of the Italian team which finished fourth in the 5000 metre relay competition. In the 500 metre event as well as in the 1000 metre contest he finished seventh and in the 1500 metre competition he finished 14th.

External links
 profile

1981 births
Living people
Italian male short track speed skaters
Olympic short track speed skaters of Italy
Short track speed skaters at the 2002 Winter Olympics
Short track speed skaters at the 2006 Winter Olympics
Short track speed skaters at the 2010 Winter Olympics
Short track speed skaters at the 2014 Winter Olympics
Olympic silver medalists for Italy
Olympic medalists in short track speed skating
Medalists at the 2002 Winter Olympics
Universiade silver medalists for Italy
Universiade medalists in short track speed skating
Competitors at the 2001 Winter Universiade